Julie Marie Gomis N’Diaye (born 7 May 1952) is a Senegalese hurdler. She competed in the women's 100 metres hurdles at the 1976 Summer Olympics.

References

External links
 

1952 births
Living people
Athletes (track and field) at the 1976 Summer Olympics
Senegalese female hurdlers
Olympic athletes of Senegal
Place of birth missing (living people)